Cornelis "Cees" Koch (16 July 1936 – 14 September 2021) was a discus thrower and shot putter from the Netherlands. As a discus thrower, he competed at the 1960 and 1964 Summer Olympics and finished in 22nd and 17th place, respectively.

With a throw of 55.96m, he won a silver medal at the 1962 European Championships in Belgrade, behind Soviet Union's Vladimir Trusenyev (57.11m). In the late 1950s and early 1960s, Koch collected sixteen Dutch titles altogether, seven in shot put and nine in discus throw.

References

Cees Koch's obituary

External links
Werpen Mannen. Periode 1945–1972. atletiekhistorici.nl

1936 births
2021 deaths
Dutch male discus throwers
Dutch male shot putters
Olympic athletes of the Netherlands
Athletes (track and field) at the 1960 Summer Olympics
Athletes (track and field) at the 1964 Summer Olympics
Athletes from Rotterdam
European Athletics Championships medalists
20th-century Dutch people